Jamil is an Arabic given name. It means "handsome" in Arabic as well as "beautiful". The Latin spelling variants include Gamil (used mainly in Egypt), Cemil (in Turkish), Djemil or Djamel (mainly in North African countries influenced by French spelling), Djamil and Jameel (mainly among African Americans influenced by English spelling). Yamil, which is the Spanish variant of the name Jamil, has the same pronunciation in Spanish, but different spelling. The feminine equivalent is Jamila (also Gamila, Cemila, Djemila, Djamila, Jameela, Yamila, Jamyla, and Jamily
).

Notable people with the given name Jamil
Jamil Abdullah al-Amin (nee Hubert Gerold Brown, born 1943), American civil rights activist and convicted murderer
Jamil Adam (born 1991), English football player
Jamil al-Assad (1932–2004), Syrian politician
Jamil Azzaoui (born 1961), Canadian comedian, radio personality, and musician
Jamil Bachir (1920–1977), Iraqi musician and sibling of Munir Bashir
Jamil al-Banna (born 1952), Palestinian-Jordanian refugee formerly held at Guantanamo Bay detention camp
Jamil Canal, Brazilian soccer player in the American Soccer League
Jamil Dehlavi (born 1944), British film/director/producer of Indian descent
Jamil Demby (born 1996), American football player
Jamil Fearrington (born 1986), Danish American football player
Jamil Ibrahim Hejailan (born 1927), Saudi diplomat
Jamil James, Trinidad and Tobago sprinter
Jamil Jean-Jacques, Haitian soccer player
Jamil al-Midfai, Iraqi politician
Jamil Mahuad, former president of Ecuador (1998–2000)
Jamil Majdalawi, Palestinian politician
Jamil Mardam Bey, Syrian politician
Jamil Moledina, American video game industry event director
Jamil Naqsh, Pakistani painter
Jamil Nasser, American jazz musician
Jamil Othman Nasser, Palestinian politician
Jamil El Reedy, Egyptian alpine skier
Jamil Roberts (soccer, born 1986), American soccer player
Jamil Rostami, Kurdish-Iranian film director
Jamil Sahid Mohamed, Sierra Leonean businessman of Lebanese descent
Jamil Sidqi al-Zahawi, Iraqi poet/philosopher
Jamil Smith, American journalist
Brigadier-General Jamil Uddin Ahmed, Bangladeshi military officer
Jamil al-Ulshi, Syrian politician and former acting head of state in Syria
Jamil Walker, American soccer player
Jamil Walker Smith, American actor
 Jamil Wilson (born 1990), American basketball player
Jamil Yamani, video artist

See also
Jamill
Professor Jamil, a small municipality in south-central Goiás state, Brazil
Cemal
Gamal (disambiguation) 
Jamal
Jamila

References

Arabic masculine given names